Kalayaan, officially the Municipality of Kalayaan, is a 5th class municipality in the South China Sea under the jurisdiction of the province of Palawan, Philippines. According to the 2020 census, it has a population of 193 people making it the least populated town in the Philippines.

It consists of a single barangay located on Pag-asa Island, which also serves as the seat of the municipal government. Besides Thitu Island, the municipality comprises six other islands: West York Island, Northeast Cay, Nanshan Island, Loaita Island, Flat Island (South China Sea) and Lankiam Cay (respectively locally named Likas, Parola, Lawak, Kota, Patag and Panata), and three shoals or reefs: Irving Reef (Balagtas Reef), Second Thomas Shoal (Ayungin Shoal) and Commodore Reef (Rizal Reef). It is the least populated municipality in the Philippines. Kalayaan's annual budget is 47 million pesos (about $1.1 million).

Kalayaan municipality has an airstrip, a naval port, a five-bed lying-in clinic, a police station, a coast guard station, a marine research station, and a small integrated elementary and high school.

Formerly an exclusively military installation, Pag-asa Island was opened to civilian settlement in 2002.

Kalayaan has the highest poverty incidence and is one of the poorest municipalities in the Philippines.

History 
There are records of inhabitance, at various times in history, by people from Champa in present-day Vietnam and by the Chinese, and during the Second World War by French Indochina and Imperial Japanese troops. However, there were no large settlements on these islands until 1956, when Filipino lawyer, businessman, adventurer and fishing magnate Tomás Cloma decided to "claim" a part of the Spratly Islands as his own, naming it the "Free Territory of Freedomland".

In 1946, Vice President Elpidio Quirino reiterated the "New Southern Islands", the forerunner name for Kalayaan, as part of the Philippines.

In 1947, Tomás Cloma "discovered" a group of several uninhabited and unoccupied islands/islets in the vastness of the Luzon Sea.

Four days later, Cloma issued and posted copies of his "Notice to the Whole World" on each of the islands as "a decisive manifestation of unwavering claim over the territory".

On May 31, 1956, Cloma declared the establishment of the Free Territory of Freedomland, ten days after sending his second representation to the Philippine Secretary of Foreign Affairs, informing the latter that the territory claimed was named "Freedomland".

On July 6, 1956, Cloma declared his claim to the whole world and the establishment of a separate government for the "Free Territory of Freedomland" with its capital on Flat Island (Patag Island). His declaration was met with violent and unfriendly reactions from several neighboring countries especially the Republic of China (ROC; on Taiwan since 1949), when it effectively garrisoned the nearby island of Itu Aba and intercepted Cloma's men and vessels found within its immediate waters on September 24, 1956.

In 1974, Cloma ceded his rights over the islands for one peso, after being imprisoned by Ferdinand Marcos.

Presidential Decree No. 1596 
President Ferdinand E. Marcos created the Municipality of Kalayaan by signing Presidential Decree No. 1596 into law on June 11, 1978. This established what the document described as "a distinct and separate municipality of the Province of Palawan".

PD 1596 defined the boundaries of the municipality as follows:
''From a point [on the Philippine Treaty Limits] at latitude 7º40' North and longitude 116º00' East of Greenwich, thence due West along the parallel of 7º40' N to its intersection with the meridian of longitude 112º10' E, thence due north along the meridian of 112º10' E to its intersection with the parallel of 9º00' N, thence north-eastward to the intersection of parallel of 12º00' N with the meridian of longitude 114º30' E, thence, due East along the parallel of 12º00' N to its intersection with the meridian of 118º00' E, thence, due South along the meridian of longitude 118º00' E to its intersection with the parallel of 10º00' N, thence Southwestwards to the point of beginning at 7º40' N, latitude and 116º00' E longitude.
i.e. 7º40'N 116º00'E; west to 7º40'N 112º10'E; north to 9º00'N 112º10'E; NE to 12º00'N 114º30'E; east to 12º00'N 118º00'E; south to 10º00'N 118º00'E; SW to 7º40'N 116º00'E.

Republic Act No. 9522 
Republic Act No. 9522, which defined the archipelagic baselines of the Philippines, claimed sovereignty over the Kalayaan Island Group under Section 2, sub-paragraph A which described the territory as a "Regime of Islands"—a concept defined in the United Nation Convention on Law of the Sea for similar bodies of land.

Rival claims 
In addition to the Philippines, China, Taiwan, Vietnam, and Malaysia all claim the Spratly Archipelago either as a whole or in part. The Philippines occupies 10 reefs and islands. The People's Republic of China presently occupies seven reefs. Vietnam occupies 21 islets and reefs. Malaysia claims 7 reefs including Layang Layang which currently hosts a naval base and a diving resort. Interest in the archipelago was reportedly triggered by Cloma's declaration and subsequent assertion by the Philippines.

In March 1976, President Marcos issued the Letter of Instruction (LOI) No.1-76 organizing the AFP Western Command based in Palawan in response to the heightening conflict of interest in the region and to abate any untoward incident.

Geography 
The municipality of Kalayaan is located in the western section of the Province of Palawan. They are:

Topography 
The islets that comprise the municipality are generally flat. The highest ground elevation is approximately two meters above sea level.

Climate

Demographics

The civilian population, which includes children, was introduced in 2001.

Infrastructure

Rancudo Airfield
Pag-asa Island (Thitu) hosts a 1,300-meter runway constructed in the early 1970s on orders of Major General Jose Rancudo, Commanding General of the Philippine Air Force. In February 1992, the Armed Forces of the Philippines named the runway "Rancudo Airfield" in honor of its architect.

Beaching Ramp and Seaport
On June 9, 2020, the Department of National Defense led the inauguration of a beaching ramp on Pag-asa Island (Thitu) which was finally completed after three years. The facility enabled to bring in more materials and equipment to repair and maintain the airstrip and building of other facilities. Also, Department of Transportation (DOTR) confirmed that the new seaport and sheltered port in the Pag-asa Island (Thitu) is completed and ready to operate by June 12.

Telecommunications
Smart Telecommunications established a cell site, connected to its main network via VSAT (Very Small Aperture Terminal), on Pag-asa Island (Thitu) in 2005 making normal GSM-based cellphone communication with the island possible. The first call on the system took place on June 12 at 5:18 PM between the mayor of the municipality at the time and a Smart Telecom executive. The company completed a maintenance visit to the cell site in 2011, thus ensuring continued operation of the facility. However, the cell site was inactive since 2015. On August 30, 2020, Smart Telecommunications repaired and upgraded its cell site for 4G/LTE services in Pag-asa Island (Thitu).

In April 2021, the Department of Information and Communications Technology announced the installation of free Wi-Fi facilities at Pag-asa Island Elementary School, Barangay Hall, and other sites on the Pag-asa Island.  This has allowed children on the island to continue with their distance learning.

Power Supply
By day, the residents get electricity from a power generator owned by the municipal government. By night, they shift to stored solar power that comes from 1.5-volt solar panels installed on the Pag-asa Island. On June 12, 2021, The National Power Corporation switched on its P33 million Kalayaan Diesel Power Plant project that covered the supply, delivery and installation of the 300 kilowatt diesel generating sets, a 13.8-kilovolt (kV) distribution line and fuel oil storage tanks, providing round-the-clock power to the facilities on the Pag-asa Island.

Environment
On June 8, 1982, Kota (Loaita) and Panata (Lankiam) islands were designated as marine turtle sanctuaries by the Ministry of National Resources (MNR) when it issued Administrative Order No. 8.

Government

The first recorded election in Kalayaan was on January 30, 1980, where Mr. Aloner M. Heraldo was elected as the first Municipal Mayor.

The Municipality of Kalayaan "demilitarized" on January 18, 1988, and the first appointed Mayor, Alejandro Rodriguez, was replaced by his appointed Vice Mayor, Gaudencio R. Avencena.

The first free election was held on May 11, 1992, where mostly young Municipal officers under the leadership of Mayor Gil D. Policarpio served for nine years (1992-2001).

A new administration assumed office on July 2, 2001, when Mayor Rosendo L. Mantes won the election on May 14, 2001.

It was replaced by Mayor Eugenio B. Bito-onon Jr. who served from June 30, 2010, to June 30, 2016.

The current Mayor of the municipality is Mayor Roberto M. del Mundo, who won an upset victory on May 9, 2016.

See also

Rejection of Chinese claims by the Permanent Court of Arbitration
Sansha, Hainan, China
Trường Sa, Khánh Hòa, Vietnam
Philippines and the Spratly Islands
Spratly Islands dispute
 Free Territory of Freedomland
Territorial disputes in the South China Sea

References

Further reading

External links

 Kalayaan Profile at PhilAtlas.com
Kalayaan Palawan - Official Website
 [ Philippine Standard Geographic Code]
Philippine Census Information
Local Governance Performance Management System

 
Municipalities of Palawan
Spratly Islands
Island municipalities in the Philippines
Establishments by Philippine presidential decree